Dior is a surname. Notable people with the surname include:

 Christian Dior (1905–1957), French fashion designer
 Catherine Dior (1917-2008), French resistance member and sister of Christian Dior
 Maurice Dior (1873-1946), French industrialist and father of Christian and Catherine Dior
 Françoise Dior (1932–1993), niece of Christian Dior and a well-known supporter of the postwar Nazi cause
 Jerry Dior (1932–2015), American graphic designer
 Karen Dior (1967–2004), American adult film performer and director

Surnames of Norman origin